Jean-Claude Pirotte (20 October 1939 – 24 May 2014) was a Belgian writer, poet and painter. A French language writer, his 2006 novel, Une adolescence en Gueldre, won the Prix des Deux Magots.

Life

Early years
Jean-Claude Pirotte was born in Namur a couple of months after the German army had invaded and occupied Belgium.   He grew up in nearby Gembloux.  Both his parents were language teachers.   During the Second World War his father worked with the Resistance, but Jean-Claude found him cold and "military" towards his own family. Pirotte later said he had hated his father:  sources record a "tormented" childhood.

First career choice
Pirotte's first "official" publication was of a book of poetry entitled 'Goût de cendre' (Taste of cinders), published in 1963.  Contrary to the expectations of some who knew him at the time, he studied law, however, and pursued a lucrative career as a lawyer between 1964 and 1975, practicing as a successful advocate at the Namur Bar. He was excluded from the legal profession in 1975 because of an offence alleged, and which he would always deny, that he had assisted the escape from prison of one of his clients.   Pirotte was also condemned to an eighteen-month prison term.   However, rather than staying to argue his case with the judges he took an opportunity to step into his red MG and escape to France, moving on later to Catalonia and then to the Aosta Valley. Having left his wife and children behind in Belgium, he led a "vagabond existence" and managed to avoid capture for the next five years. At the end of that time his sentencing had reached the end of its "shelf-life", and Jean-Claude Pirotte was able to return to Namur and go about his daily life.
 Jean-Claude Pirotte: Bibliography (not a complete list)
Goût de cendre poèmes, Thone, 1963
Contrée poèmes, Thone 1965 
D'un mourant paysage poèmes, Thone 1969
Journal moche essai, Luneau-Ascot, 1981, 1993.
La Pluie à Rethel roman, Luneau-Ascot, 1982; rééd. La Table Ronde, Paris, 2001, 2002  
Fond de cale roman, Le Sycomore, 1984; rééd. Le Temps qu'il fait, 1991
Un été dans la combe roman, La Longue Vue, 1986, rééd. La Table Ronde, Paris, 1993  
La Vallée de misère poèmes, Le temps qu'il fait, 1987, rééd. Le Temps qu'il fait, 1997
Les Contes bleus du vin chroniques, Le Temps qu'il fait, 1988
Sarah, feuille morte roman, Le Temps qu'il fait, 1989
La Légende des petits matins roman, Manya 1990, rééd. La Table Ronde, Paris, 1996  
L'Épreuve du jour enfantine, Le Temps qu'il fait, 1991, 1998
Fond de cale roman, Le Temps qu'il fait, 1991. 
Récits incertains mélanges, Le Temps qu'il fait, 1992
Il est minuit depuis toujours essais, La Table Ronde, Paris, 1993
Lettres de Sainte Croix du Mont (photographies de Jean-Luc Chapin), L'Escampette, 1993 
Plis perdus mélanges, La Table Ronde, Paris, 1994
Un voyage en automne récit, La Table Ronde, Paris, 1996
Cavale roman, La Table Ronde, Paris, 1997
Boléro roman, La Table Ronde, Paris, 1998
Faubourg poèmes, Le Temps qu'il fait, 1997, 1998 
Le Noël du cheval de bois conte illustré, Le Temps qu'il fait, 1997,1998
Mont Afrique roman, Le Cherche Midi, 1999
Autres arpents chroniques, La Table Ronde, Paris, 2000
Enjoués monostiches (avec Jean-Marie Queneau), La Goulotte, 2000  
Ange Vincent roman, La Table Ronde, Paris, 2001
Les Chiens du vent (avec Pierre Silvain), Cadex, 2002
Rue des Remberges prélude, Le Temps qu'il fait, 2003
Un rêve en Lotharingie récit, National Geographic et Stock, 2003
Dame et dentiste poèmes, Inventaire/Invention, 2003
Fougerolles poèmes, Virgile, 2004 
La Boîte à musique (avec Sylvie Doizelet) poèmes, La Table ronde, 2004
Une adolescence en Gueldre roman, La Table ronde, 2005, Prix des Deux Magots
Expédition nocturne autour de ma cave récit, Stock, 2006
Un bruit ordinaire suivi de Blues de la racaille poèmes, La Table Ronde, 2006 
Hollande  poèmes et peintures, Le Cherche Midi, 2006
Un voyage en automne, La Table Ronde, 1996 
Absent de Bagdad roman, La table ronde, 2007
Passage des ombres, La Table Ronde, 2008, prix Roger-Kowalski et grand prix de Poésie de la Ville de Lyon 2008
Revermont, Le Temps qu'il fait, 2008
Avoir été, Le Taillis Pré, 2008
Le Promenoir magique et autres poèmes 1953–2003, La table ronde, 2009
Voix de Bruxelles (avec Hugues Robaye), CFC, 2009
Autres séjours, Le Temps qu'il fait, 2010
Cette âme perdue, Le Castor Astral, 2011, prix Apollinaire 2011
Place des savannes, Le Cherche Midi, 2011
Ajoie, La Table ronde, 2012, 
Le très vieux temps, Le Temps qu'il fait, 2012
Vaine pâture, Mercure de France, 2013
Brouillard, Le Cherche Midi, 2013
Gens sérieux s'abstenir, Le Castor Astral, 2014
Portrait craché, Le Cherche Midi, 2014
À Saint-Léger suis réfugié, L'Arrière-Pays, 2014

Second career choice
He nevertheless resisted any temptation to return to his career as a lawyer, explaining that his clash with the judiciary had given him an opportunity to escape, and the magistrates who had sentenced him to a prison had in a sense done him a favour, because they had given him the opening to live an unconventional live-style. Instead of the law, he devoted the balance of his life to literature and poetry, publishing nearly fifty books, substantial articles, and poems.   He was also a painter and applied this talent to illustrating several books.

Growing public profile
Commentators on French language Belgian literature started to notice Pirotte towards the end of the 1980s.   His novel "Sarah feuille morte" (1989) drew attention, as did "La pluie à Rethel", a novel originally published in 1982 and then reissued in 2001 and again in 2002.   Pirotte was a lover of literature in both French and Flemish/Dutch.   An eloquent admirer of writers such as André Dhôtel, Georges Bernanos, Guido Gezelle, Frederik van Eeden, Georges Rodenbach or Jacques Chardonne, Pirotte himself became a member of his generation's literary elite.

Final decades
Between 1998 and 2002 Pirotte settled near Carcassonne, where he created a literary prize named after the wines of his adopted region, "prix littéraire Cabardès".   As a further tribute to the locality he became the "director" of a literary series entitled "Lettres du Cabardès" which was produced by the publishing house Le Temps qu'il fait.

During his later years Pirotte lived with the translator and fellow author Sylvie Doizelet in the French Jura, till 2009 at Arbois, and subsequently across the frontier, at Beurnevésin. In an interview given in 2011 he stated that they also still rented "a loft" on the Belgian coast. By this time Jean-Claude Pirotte was cursed with cancer, from which he died in the summer of 2014.

Recognition
With supporters from the literary establishment that included Jean-Edern Hallier, Pirotte became a familiar figure in the francophone media-literary scene during the 1980s and 1990s.

Awards (not a complete list)
 1963 Franz de Wever prize
 1986 Victor Rossel Prize for Un été dans la combe
 1993 Grand Prix de Poésie du Mont-Saint-Michel (now renamed, Grand Prix International de Poésie Guillevic-Ville de Saint-Malo)
 2002 Marguerite-Duras Prize for Autres arpents
 2006 Prize of Les Deux Magots for Une adolescence en Gueldre
 2008 Roger Kowalski Prize for Passage des ombres
 2009 Maurice Carême Prize
 2009 Louis Montalte Prize for poetry
 2011 Guillaume Apollinaire Prize for Cette âme perdue et Autres séjours
 2011 Marcel Thiry Prize for Autres Séjours 
 2011 Pierre Mac Orlan Prize for Place des savannes
 2012 Académie française top Poetry Prize
 2012 Goncourt Poetry Prize

References

Belgian male poets
Belgian poets in French
20th-century Belgian painters
21st-century Belgian painters
People from Namur (city)
Walloon movement activists
20th-century Belgian lawyers
Prix des Deux Magots winners
Prix Valery Larbaud winners
1939 births
2014 deaths
20th-century Belgian poets
21st-century Belgian writers
20th-century Belgian male writers
Prix Guillaume Apollinaire winners